Keolis is a multinational transportation company that operates public transport systems. The company manages bus, rapid transit, tram, coach networks, rental bikes, car parks, water taxi, cable car, trolleybus and funicular services.

Based in Paris, France, the company is 70% owned by SNCF and 30% owned by the Caisse de dépôt et placement du Québec.

Locations 
Keolis operates a number of networks in France (Transports Bordeaux Métropole in Bordeaux, the Lyon public transport on behalf of SYTRAL, the public transport service for the Greater Rennes area since 1998, Transpole in Lille and the entire mobility chain in Dijon).

Internationally, it manages buses in several cities in Sweden, central and eastern regions of the Netherlands, commuter trains in Boston, the Las Vegas bus network, the Hyderabad automated metro, the Melbourne tramway, the Docklands Light Railway in London, the Pujiang Shanghai Metro, Nottingham Express Transit and the Manchester Metrolink tramway.

In 2018, the company generated revenues of €5.9 billion and had 63,000 employees. Keolis has been led by Patrick Jeantet since February 2020.

History

Origins
Keolis was formed from several former companies:
Société des transports automobiles, which was created in 1908, and its subsidiary Société générale des transports départementaux
Lesexel, an electricity company created in 1911 to support the development of tramways

These companies underwent a series of reorganizations, mergers and acquisitions, which resulted in two companies: , focused primarily on urban transport, and Cariane, specialized in interurban public transport.

Creation and development of Keolis in the 2000s
In 1999, SNCF became the leading shareholder in VIA-GTI, which merged with Cariane in 2001 to become Keolis.
In 2005, through its stake in GoVia, Keolis became co-owner of the South Eastern rail franchise in the United Kingdom.
In 2006, Keolis won the franchise for Hellweg Net in Germany and later on for Maas-Rhein-Lippe Net and Teutoburger-Wald Net in Deutschland and Nederland. In 2007, Keolis acquired City-Trafic in Denmark.
In 2008, Keolis took control of Eurobus Holding in Belgium. In 2009, Keolis set up operations in Melbourne, Washington, D.C., Bergen and Bordeaux.
In 2010, EFFIA (car parks company) became a Keolis subsidiary.

Since 2010
In 2012, Keolis acquired 100% of Syntus in the Netherlands and Orléans Express in Canada. The company also set up operations in Hyderabad, India. In 2013, Keolis won part of the Las Vegas urban network. In 2014, Keolis won a 30-year public-private partnership contract to maintain and operate the Ion rapid transit in Waterloo, Ontario, Canada.

In the same year, Keolis won the operations and maintenance contract for Metrolink, the United Kingdom's largest tramway network, in Manchester, and was also selected by Foothill Transit to operate and maintain the Municipal Transit Network for the Eastern San Gabriel Valley of Los Angeles County .

The company also expands in Asia, starting operation of Hyderabad's automatic air metro network, and winning, as part of a joint venture with RATP Dev and the Qatar Hamad Group, the contract to operate and maintain Qatar's first public transport network, including the operation of the future automatic metro in Doha and the tramway network in the new city of Lusail.

In 2018, Keolis started operating the Pujiang metro line (formerly known as 8.3), the first automatic metro line in the Shanghai network, and started a contract to operate the Wales & Borders rail network in Wales until the nationalisation of day to day services in February 2021, with Keolis retaining a partnership with the new national operator until the original contract expires.

Operations

Australia

Keolis holds a 51% shareholding in Keolis Downer, which has operated the Melbourne tram network since November 2009. Keolis Downer has operated the G:link light rail line on the Gold Coast since July 2014.

In March 2015, Keolis Downer purchased bus operator Australian Transit Enterprises, which operates the Hornibrook Bus Lines, LinkSA, Path Transit and SouthLink operations with 930 buses. In July 2017, Keolis Downer trading as Newcastle Transport took over the Newcastle Buses & Ferries business under a 10-year contract. Newcastle Transport also operates the Newcastle Light Rail since February 2019. In October 2019, the Government of New South Wales announced that the bus operations of State Transit were to be contracted out to the private sector. In May 2021, Keolis Downer was awarded the contract to operate Sydney Bus Region 8. Keolis Downer Northern Beaches (KDNB) commenced operating on 31 October 2021 with its contract to run for eight years.

Canada
Keolis Canada operates as a subsidiary of Keolis America. The majority of its Canadian operations are located in Montreal, where it operates the Quebec intercity bus company Orléans Express and part of the Exo Mascouche sector.

From 2004 to 2012 it also operated Acadian Lines intercity buses in The Maritimes. The latter services have since been taken over by independent operator Maritime Bus.

Keolis is a partner in the GrandLinq consortium and operator of the Ion rapid transit system in Waterloo Region, Ontario.

China
In China, Keolis and Shanghai Shentong Metro Group, the owner of Shanghai Metro, created a joint venture called Shanghai Keolis in March 2014. Shanghai Keolis started operating the Pujiang line (formerly Phase 3 of Shanghai Metro Line 8 ) in March 2018. It would also be operating Shanghai Pudong International Airport's people mover system in 2019, which will link the proposed satellite concourse building with the existing Terminal 1 and Terminal 2. as well as the Songjiang Tram within the Songjiang Region, a suburb west of Shanghai downtown, in 2020.

An agreement had been signed between Keolis and Hubei Government, and Keolis will be responsible for Greater Wuhan area's suburban railway operation.

Denmark
Keolis Danmark is the second biggest bus operator in Denmark with 500 buses and 1.500 employees, Keolis entered the Danish market in 1999 when they bought 49% of the Danish bus operator City-Trafik in 2007 City-Trafik became a wholly owned subsidiary of Keolis, in 2014 City-Trafik surprised the Danish bus industry when they announced their plans to merger with Nettbuss Danish subsidiary in a joint venture where Keolis owned 75% and Nettbuss 25%, until the merger was accepted by the Danish authorities the former City-Trafik was named Keolis Bus Danmark and the former Nettbuss Danmark was named Keolis Danmark the Danish authorities accepted the merger in late 2014 and in 2015 both the companies were merged into Keolis Danmark. It was also in 2015 that Keolis won the contract on operating the first tram in Denmark in Aarhus set to open in 2017. In 2016 Keolis SA bought the last 25% of the shares from Nettbuss AS making Keolis Danmark 100% Keolis owned

France
Keolis has extensive operations in France. It provides transit services in many cities including Bordeaux, Dijon, Lille, Lyon, Orléans, and Rennes. In January 2016, the 260 vehicle Transports Daniel Myers business was purchased. Based in the Essonne/Val-de-Marne basin, its main operations are in Montlhéry, Etampes and Avrainville.

Germany

Under the brand name Eurobahn, Keolis operated multiple regional train services in the German state of North Rhine-Westphalia, Lower Saxony and in the Netherlands. Eurobahn used Stadler Flirt electric multiple units and Bombardier Talent diesel cars to serve these lines. The business was sold to a subsidiary of the law firm Noerr, effective 31 December 2021.

India

In 2012, Keolis won the Operation and Maintenance contract of the Hyderabad Metro Rail project. This marks Keolis's foray into the Indian market. The "Hyderabad Metro Rail Project" is valued at 220 billion.The Keolis Hyderabad along with L&T had started metro rail operations from 27 November 2017.

Netherlands

Keolis's subsidiary in Netherlands is Keolis Nederland, originally named Syntus.

In 1999, Keolis commenced operations in the Netherlands through a 33% shareholding in Syntus. In 2007 this was increased to 50%. In 2012, Keolis purchased Nederlandse Spoorwegen's 50% share, acquiring 100% control. The Syntus brand was retired in October 2017 and replaced by the Keolis Nederland brand.

Norway

Keolis's subsidiary in Norway is Keolis Norge. It was first formed in 2008 as Fjord1 Partner, a joint venture between Fjord1 Nordvestlandske (49%) and Keolis Nordic (51%). It has been fully owned by Keolis since 2014.

United Kingdom

In the United Kingdom, Keolis owns 35% of Govia that owns Govia Thameslink Railway, operator of the Thameslink, Southern & Great Northern franchise and previously operated Thameslink, Southeastern and London Midland. Keolis also had a 45% shareholding in First TransPennine Express from February 2004 until March 2016. Upon being re-tendered, FirstGroup took full control.

In 2012, Keolis lodged a joint bid with SNCF for the aborted InterCity West Coast franchise and in 2014, in partnership with Eurostar, lodged a bid for the InterCity East Coast franchise.

Keolis is part of a consortium that commenced operating the Nottingham Express Transit tram operation in December 2011. Keolis in partnership with Amey operates the Docklands Light Railway and Manchester Metrolink concessions.

On 14 October 2018, KeolisAmey Wales commenced operating the Wales & Borders franchise, under the Welsh Government owned Transport for Wales brand. On 7 February 2021, the franchise was nationalised by the Welsh Government, moving to a concession model with KeolisAmey retaining an involvement in delivering some infrastructure projects.

United States
Keolis America is based in Boston, Massachusetts. It does business as Keolis North America, operating public transportation contracts in both the U.S. and Canada. In the U.S., its subsidiaries operate commuter rail systems in Virginia and Massachusetts, as well as fixed-route and shuttle bus systems in several states. In Nevada, Keolis it bus service for the Las Vegas strip through a contract with the Regional Transportation Commission.

On 16 October 2009, the Virginia Railway Express (VRE) Operations Board approved an $85 million contract with Keolis Rail Services America to operate and maintain VRE trains for five years. Keolis began operating VRE on 12 July 2010 after a two-week delay, ending Amtrak's 18-year tenure as operator. Both Amtrak and Keolis had staffed the VRE lines with about 80 employees. However, during the bidding, a group of Holocaust survivors and Maryland politician Heather Mizeur called for investigations into SNCF's role in transportation of Nazi prisoners to concentration camps during World War II before the Keolis contracts could move forward. The operator of the train line, Amtrak, also challenged the propriety of hiring a foreign company.

It has also bid to run some California commuter rail segments and two MARC lines in Maryland, even though with the latter, the company is running into similar issues with the VRE bidding. Another group of Holocaust survivors, led by now-deceased Leo Bretholz also requested investigations of SNCF's involvement in the war. As a result, a law was passed to enforce this, leading to major criticism because SNCF had already documented their role in the deportation and had in fact released their archives for research and educational purposes in 1996. Eventually however, Keolis would lose to Canadian company Bombardier Transportation.

On 29 November 2011, Keolis Transit America, Keolis' US subsidiary, announced acquisition of Tectrans Inc., a California-based privately held provider of contract transportation services. Tectrans holdings included in the acquisition included Mobility Plus Transportation, Western Transit Systems, and Diversified Transportation. Keolis bus operations in the United States include Foothill Transit, Tri-Rail Commuter Connectors, and RTC.

On 8 January 2014 the Massachusetts Bay Transportation Authority awarded Keolis Commuter Services a contract to operate 664 miles of passenger service  for $2.68 billion over eight years, with the possibility for two two-year extensions that could bring the total price to $4.3 billion. It began operating the MBTA Commuter Rail on 1 July 2014.

Qatar
On 7 December 2017, Qatar Rail, the Qatari national public transport operator, awarded RKH Qitarat — the joint venture based on a consortium between RATP Dev and Keolis (49%) and the Qatari company Hamad Group (51%) — the operations and maintenance contract for the new automated metro of Doha, the capital of Qatar , and a light rail network in Lusail, 15 km from Doha’s city center

Sweden 

Keolis Sverige was founded in 2003 when Keolis bought 70% Busslink and the rest in 2010. Keolis Sverige is second largest operator in Swedish bus market. Keolis Sverige operates 1000 SL bus in Stockholm and 1800 buses in rest of Sweden.

Corporate responsibility and strategy
The firm is expanding into new markets (through public calls for tenders in France and worldwide) and launching innovative initiatives in mobility.

Autonomous shuttles and automated metro systems 
The company's main innovations in public transport operations are driverless shuttles and automated metro systems:
Public transport services by self-driving shuttle (through a partnership with Navya, a French manufacturer of self-driving shuttles), which started in September 2016 in Lyon. Keolis currently runs self-driving shuttle services in France and worldwide, particularly in La Défense and Las Vegas.
Automated metro systems in Shanghai and Hyderabad.

Digital services 
Keolis offers trip planning, booking and payment services:
The launch in 2015 of the Plan Book Ticket digital app, which combines “plan” features to organize trips, “book” features to reserve them and “ticket” features to obtain and validate a ticket directly using a smartphone
The Launch in 2018 of an open payment solution on the Dijon transport network (bank cards can now be used as tickets)
The introduction of the HelloGo app, which enables passengers to plan, reserve and purchase their tickets for all modes of transport in Utrecht

Corporate responsibility

Electromobility and alternative energies
Keolis uses electromobility and alternative energies on several of its networks:
Launch of a biomethane bus service in Sweden in 2015
Launch of electric bus service in Rennes, Orléans and Los Angeles
Launch of a natural gas bus service in Montargis in 2018

Transport for passengers with reduced mobility
Keolis operates transport services for passengers with reduced mobility, such as PAM75 in Paris and PAM94 in the Val-de-Marne department of France.

Key data

Keolis generated revenues of €5.4 billion in 2017. Net profits (group share) amounted to €51 million.

Keolis transports 3 billion passengers annually. 
International business represents 45% of the company's revenues

In 2017, the company had 63,000 employees in France and worldwide.

References

External links
www.keolis.com Official website

 
Public transport operators
Bus operating companies
Public transport operators in France
Companies based in Paris
French brands
Transport companies established in 2001
French companies established in 2001